Atelopus simulatus is a species of toad in the family Bufonidae.
It is endemic to Colombia.
Its natural habitats are subtropical or tropical moist montane forests and rivers.
It is threatened by habitat loss.

References

simulatus
Amphibians of Colombia
Amphibians of the Andes
Endemic fauna of Colombia
Amphibians described in 1994
Taxonomy articles created by Polbot